2011 in Bellator MMA was the fourth installment of the Bellator Fighting Championships. Mixed martial arts tournaments were held in multiple weight classes, including three of the original tournament classes: Welterweight, Lightweight and Featherweight. There was also an inaugural Light Heavyweight Tournament taking place during this season, which crowned the first Light Heavyweight Champion in Bellator. This was the first season to air on MTV2.

Bellator 35

Bellator 35 was a mixed martial arts event held by Bellator Fighting Championships. The event took place on March 5, 2011 at the Tachi Palace Hotel and Casino in Lemoore, California. The card kicked off Bellator Season Four and featured opening round fights in the Season Four Welterweight Tournament. The event was distributed live in prime time by MTV2.

Background

On December 14, 2010, Bellator and MTV2 announced a three-year deal to broadcast Bellator's tournaments and special events. This will be the first Bellator event to air on MTV2.

Bellator's Women's Strawweight Champion Zoila Frausto fought in a non-title catchweight bout against Karina Hallinan.

At this event Steve Carl was expected to fight Jay Hieron in the opening round of the welterweight tournament. However, Carl injured himself during training and was removed from the tournament. His replacement was Anthony Lapsley.

Poppies Martinez was expected to fight at this event, but a bout never materialized.

The event drew an average of around 200,000 viewers on MTV2. Which helped MTV2 in several key advertising demographics including, an 83 percent increase among men aged 18 to 49, an 80 percent increase among men 18 to 34, and a 133 percent increase among men aged 25 to 34.

Results

Main card
 Welterweight Quarterfinal bout:  Chris Lozano vs.  Lyman Good
Good defeated Lozano via unanimous decision (29–28, 30–27, 30–27).
 Welterweight Quarterfinal bout:  Anthony Lapsley vs.  Jay Hieron
Hieron defeated Lapsley via technical submission (rear-naked choke) at 3:39 of Round 1
 Welterweight Quarterfinal bout:  Jim Wallhead vs.  Rick Hawn
Hawn defeated Wallhead via unanimous decision (29–28, 29–28, 30–27).
 Welterweight Quarterfinal bout:  Brent Weedman vs.  Dan Hornbuckle
Weedman defeated Hornbuckle via unanimous decision (29–28, 29–28, 29–28).

Local feature fights
 Women's (125 lb) bout:  Zoila Gurgel vs.  Karina Hallinan
Gurgel defeated Hallinan via unanimous decision (30–27, 30–27, 30–27).
 Catchweight (175 lb) bout:  Waachiim Spiritwolf vs.  Jaime Jara
Spiritwolf defeated Jara via split decision (28–29, 29–28, 30–27). This bout aired the following week on Bellator 36.
 Featherweight bout:  Josh Herrick vs.  Brandon Bender
Bender defeated Herrick via submission (guillotine choke) at 3:42 of Round 1
 Bantamweight bout:  Jesus Castro vs.  Paul Ruiz
Ruiz defeated Castro via TKO (punches) at 1:17 of Round 1

Bellator 36

Bellator 36 was a mixed martial arts event held by Bellator Fighting Championships. The event took place on March 12, 2011, at the Shreveport Municipal Auditorium in Shreveport, Louisiana. The card featured opening-round fights in the Bellator Season Four Lightweight Tournament. The event was distributed live in prime time by MTV2.

Background

Toby Imada was originally scheduled to face French fighter Ferrid Kheder; however, Kheder refused to weigh in and Josh Shockley was moved up from the preliminary card to face Imada.

Shockley's original opponent, Kelvin Hackney, still weighed in, but was pulled off the card and paid his show money and win bonus. Hackney was expected to fight at Bellator 45.

The event drew an estimated 230,000 viewers on MTV2.

Results

Main card
 Lightweight Quarterfinal bout:  Rob McCullough vs.  Patricky Freire
Freire defeated McCullough via TKO (punches) at 3:11 of round 3.
 Lightweight Quarterfinal bout:  Toby Imada vs.  Josh Shockley
Imada defeated Shockley via verbal submission (armbar) at 1:36 of round 1.
 Lightweight Quarterfinal bout:  Carey Vanier vs.  Lloyd Woodard
Woodard defeated Vanier via TKO (punches) at 0:46 of round 2.
 Lightweight Quarterfinal bout:  Michael Chandler vs.  Marcin Held
Chandler defeated Held via technical submission (arm-triangle choke) at 3:56 of round 1.

Local feature fights
 Middleweight bout:  Kelly Leo vs.  Chad Leonhardt
Leonhardt defeated Leo via TKO (corner stoppage) at 5:00 of round 2.
 Catchweight (150 lb) bout:  Matt Hunt vs.  Kevin Aguilar
Aguilar defeated Hunt via TKO (punches) at 3:02 of round 1. This bout aired on the MTV2 broadcast following Imada vs. Shockley.
 Catchweight (150 lb) bout:  Javone Duhon vs.  Booker Arthur
Arthur defeated Duhon via verbal submission (elbows) at 2:31 of round 2.

Bellator 37

Bellator 37 was a mixed martial arts event held by Bellator Fighting Championships. The event took place on March 19, 2011 at the Lucky Star Casino in Concho, Oklahoma. The card featured opening round fights in the Bellator Season Four Featherweight Tournament. The event was distributed live in prime time by MTV2. The event drew an estimated 173,000 viewers on MTV2.

Results

Main card
 Featherweight Quarterfinal bout:  Georgi Karakhanyan vs.  Patricio Freire
Freire defeated Karakhanyan via KO (punches) at 0:56 of round 3.
 Featherweight Quarterfinal bout:  Wilson Reis vs.  Zac George
Reis defeated George via submission (rear naked choke) at 2:09 of round 1.
 Featherweight Quarterfinal bout:  Daniel Straus vs.  Nazareno Malegarie
Straus defeated Malegarie via unanimous decision (29–28, 29–28, 29–28).
 Featherweight Quarterfinal bout:  Kenny Foster vs.  Eric Larkin
Foster defeated Larkin via submission (guillotine choke) at 3:15 of round 1.

Local feature fights
 Middleweight bout:  Jake Rosholt vs.  John Bryant
Rosholt defeated Bryant via technical submission (rear naked choke) in round 1.
 Lightweight bout:  Jeremy Spoon vs.  Jerrod Sanders
Spoon defeated Sanders via submission (rear naked choke) at 0:26 of round 2.
 Featherweight bout:  Roli Delgado vs.  Jameel Massouh
Delgado defeated Massouh via unanimous decision (29–28, 29–28, 30–27).
 Lightweight bout:  Brandon Shelton vs.  Adam Snook
Shelton defeated Snook via submission (arm-triangle choke) at 2:45 of round 1.

Bellator 38

Bellator 38 was mixed martial arts event held by Bellator Fighting Championships. The event took place on March 26, 2011 at Harrah's Tunica Hotel and Casino in Tunica, Mississippi. The card featured the opening round fights in the Bellator Season Four Light Heavyweight Tournament. The event was distributed live in prime time by MTV2.

Background

This event showcased the inaugural light heavyweight tournament.

Originally, Blagoy Ivanov was set to fight John Brown on the undercard. However, Brown pulled out of the bout and was replaced by Johnathan Ivey. Ivey was then pulled off the card for a suspension by the Georgia Athletic Commission. Ivanov instead fought William Penn.

The event drew an estimated 150,000 viewers on MTV2.

Results

Main card
 Light Heavyweight Quarterfinal bout:   Tim Carpenter vs.  Daniel Gracie
Carpenter defeated Gracie via split decision (29–28, 28–29, 29–28).
 Light Heavyweight Quarterfinal bout:   D.J. Linderman vs.  Raphael Davis
Linderman defeated Davis via TKO (Punches) at 3:40 of round 3.
 Light Heavyweight Quarterfinal bout:  Rich Hale vs.  Nik Fekete
Hale defeated Fekete via Submission (Inverted Triangle Choke) at 1:55 of round 1.
 Light Heavyweight Quarterfinal bout:  Chris Davis vs.  Christian M'Pumbu
M'Pumbu defeated Davis via TKO (strikes) at 3:34 of round 3.

Local feature fights
 Lightweight bout:  Jimmy Van Horn vs.  Austin Lyons
Lyons defeated Van Horn via submission (armbar) at 2:10 of round 1.
 Catchweight 150 lb bout:  Jake Underwood vs.  Tim Galluzzi
Underwood defeated Galluzzi via submission (triangle choke) at 1:04 of round 1.
 Light Heavyweight bout:  Brian Albin vs.  Cody Donovan
Donovan defeated Albin via unanimous decision (30–27, 30–27, 30–27).
 Heavyweight bout:  Blagoy Ivanov vs.  William Penn
Ivanov defeated Penn via TKO (punches) at 2:58 of round 1.
 Middleweight bout:  Amaechi Oselukwue vs.  Abe Wilson
Oselukwue defeated Wilson via unanimous decision (29–28, 29–28, 29–28).

Bellator 39

Bellator 39 was a mixed martial arts held by Bellator Fighting Championships. The event took place on April 2, 2011 at the Mohegan Sun Arena in Uncasville, Connecticut. The card featured one semi-final fight in both the Bellator Season Four Welterweight and Lightweight Tournaments. The event was distributed live in prime time by MTV2.

Background

The lightweight semifinal bout between Toby Imada and Patricky Freire was originally set to take place at Bellator 40.

In a last-minute change not announced by the promotion, Luiz Azeredo stepped in to replace Matt Veach in a preliminary card matchup.

The event drew an estimated 174,000 viewers on MTV2.

Results

Main card
 Lightweight Championship bout:  Eddie Alvarez (c) vs.  Pat Curran
Alvarez defeated Curran via unanimous decision (49–46, 50–45, 50–45) to retain the Bellator Lightweight Championship.
 Welterweight Semifinal bout:  Rick Hawn vs.  Lyman Good
Hawn defeated Good via split decision (29–28, 28–29, 30–27).
 Lightweight Semifinal bout:  Toby Imada vs.  Patricky Freire
Freire defeated Imada via KO (Flying Knee & Punches) at 2:53 of round 1.
 Catchweight (175 lb) bout:  Ben Saunders vs.  Matt Lee
Saunders defeated Lee via TKO (Doctor Stoppage) at 1:24 of round 3.

Local feature fights
 Middleweight bout:  Dan Cramer vs.  Greg Rebello
Cramer defeated Rebello via unanimous decision (30–27, 30–27, 30–27).  This was a "dark" fight, after the main event.
 Welterweight bout:  Mike Winters vs.  Ryan Quinn
Quinn defeated Winters via unanimous decision (30–27, 30–27, 30–26).
 Lightweight bout:  Dave Jansen vs.  Scott McAfee
Jansen defeated McAfee via submission (D'arce choke) at 4:58 of round 1.
 Catchweight (160 lbs) bout:  Luiz Azeredo vs.  Renê Nazare
Nazare defeated Azeredo via TKO (Injury) at 5:00 of round 1.
 Bantamweight bout:  John McLaughlin vs.  Blair Tugman
McLaughlin defeated Tugman via unanimous decision (29–28, 29–28, 29–28).

Bellator 40

Bellator 40 was a mixed martial arts event held by Bellator Fighting Championships. The event took place on April 9, 2011 at First Council Casino in Newkirk, Oklahoma. The card featured fights in the Welterweight and Lightweight Bellator Season Four Tournament. The event was distributed live in prime time by MTV2.

Background

Bellator Welterweight champion Ben Askren competed in a non-title bout against Nick Thompson at this event.

A lightweight semifinal bout between Toby Imada and Patricky Freire was originally set to take place on this card. However, the fight was moved to Bellator 39 and replaced with the welterweight semifinal fight between Brent Weedman and Jay Hieron. The Hieron-Weedman fight was rescheduled because Weedman needed to receive clearance for a facial laceration suffered in his Bellator 35 victory over Dan Hornbuckle.

Former Sengoku fighter Ronnie Mann was expected to make his Bellator debut at this event. However, visa issues kept Mann from entering the United States and his fight has been pushed back to the Bellator 42 card.

The event drew an estimated 218,000 viewers on MTV2.

Results

Main card
 Welterweight bout:  Ben Askren vs.  Nick Thompson
Askren defeated Thompson via unanimous decision (30–26, 30–27, 30–27).
 Welterweight Semifinal bout:  Brent Weedman vs.  Jay Hieron
Hieron defeated Weedman via unanimous decision (29–28, 29–28, 29–28).
 Lightweight Semifinal bout:  Lloyd Woodard vs.  Michael Chandler
Chandler defeated Woodard via unanimous decision (29–28, 29–28, 29–28).

Local feature fights
 Welterweight bout:  Tyler Stinson vs.  Nate James
Stinson defeated James via split decision (28–29, 29–28, 29–28).
 Lightweight bout:  Cody Carrillo vs.  Michael Osborn
Osborn defeated Carillo via TKO (strikes) at 1:27 of round 1.
 Heavyweight bout:  Eric Prindle vs.  Josh Burns
Prindle defeated Burns via TKO (doctor stoppage) at 5:00 of round 2 to earn a spot in Bellator's Season Five Heavyweight Tournament. The bout aired on the main broadcast.
 Welterweight bout:  Dylan Smith vs.  David Rickels
Rickels defeated Smith via submission (triangle choke) at 3:32 of round 1.

Bellator 41

Bellator 41 was a mixed martial arts event held by Bellator Fighting Championships on April 16, 2011 at Cocopah Resort and Casino in Yuma, Arizona. The card featured two semi-final fights in the Bellator Season Four Featherweight Tournament. The event was distributed live in prime time by MTV2.

Background

Tony Johnson was expected to fight Carlos Flores at the event, but for unknown reasons was replaced by Rudy Aguilar.

The event drew a season low of 132,000 average viewers on MTV2.

Results

Main card
 Catchweight (137 lb) bout:  Joe Warren vs.  Marcos Galvão
Warren defeated Galvão via unanimous decision (30–27, 29–28. 29–28)
 Featherweight Semifinal bout:  Wilson Reis vs.  Patricio Freire
Freire defeated Reis via KO (punches) at 3:29 of round 3.
 Bantamweight bout:  Zach Makovsky vs.  Chad Robichaux
Makovsky defeated Robichaux via TKO (strikes) at 2:02 of round 3.
 Featherweight Semifinal bout:  Daniel Straus vs.  Kenny Foster
Straus defeated Foster via submission (guillotine choke) at 3:48 of round 3.

Local feature fights
 Heavyweight bout:  Rudy Aguilar vs.  Carlos Flores
Flores defeated Aguilar via TKO (punches) at 1:19 of round 1. This bout took place after the main event.
 Bantamweight bout:  Anthony Birchak vs.  Tyler Bialecki
Birchak defeated Bialecki via submission (D'arce choke) at 4:06 of round 1.
 Featherweight bout:  Michael Parker vs.  Nick Piedmont
Piedmont defeated Parker via split decision (30–27, 28–29, 29–28).
 Middleweight bout:  Brendan Tierney vs.  Dano Moore
Tierney defeated Moore via submission (armbar) at 0:49 of round 1.

Bellator 42

Bellator 42 was a mixed martial arts event held by Bellator Fighting Championships. The event took place on April 23, 2011 at the Lucky Star Casino in Concho, Oklahoma. The card featured the semi-finals in the Bellator Season Four Light Heavyweight Tournament. The event was distributed live in prime time by MTV2.

Background

Bellator Heavyweight champion Cole Konrad was scheduled to compete in a non-title "super fight" bout against Paul Buentello at this event. However, it was revealed that Buentello had to pull out of the bout due to a back injury.

Former Sengoku fighter Ronnie Mann was expected to make his Bellator debut at Bellator 40. However, visa issues kept Mann from entering the United States and the fight was moved to this card.

Chris Guillen was originally set to fight Mark Holata, but Guillen suffered a last minute injury and was replaced by Tracy Willis.

The event drew an estimated 199,000 viewers on MTV2.

Results

Main card
 Light Heavyweight Semifinal bout:  Rich Hale vs.  D.J. Linderman
Hale defeated Linderman via split decision (29–28, 28–29, 29–28).
 Catchweight (147 lbs) bout:  Ronnie Mann vs.  Josh Arocho
Mann defeated Arocho via unanimous decision (30–25, 30–27, 30–27).
 Light Heavyweight Semifinal bout:  Tim Carpenter vs.  Christian M'Pumbu
M'Pumbu defeated Carpenter via TKO (punches) at 2:08 of round 1.
 Bantamweight bout:  Luis Nogueira vs.  Jerod Spoon
Nogueira defeated Spoon via unanimous decision (30–27, 29–28. 29–28).

Local feature fights
 Featherweight bout:  Owen Evinger vs.  Brandon Shelton
Shelton defeated Evinger via submission (rear-naked choke) at 2:35 of round 1. This bout was fought after the main broadcast was finished due to time constraints.
 Catchweight (190 lb) bout:  Chris Bell vs.  Jared Hess
Hess defeated Bell via submission (triangle choke) at 1:40 of round 1. The bout aired on the main broadcast.
 Bantamweight bout:  Shane Howell vs.  Mark Oshiro
Howell defeated Oshiro via submission (D'arce choke) at 4:15 of round 1.
 Heavyweight bout:  Mark Holata vs.  Tracy Willis
Holata defeated Willis via submission (strikes) at 0:49 of round 1.

Bellator 43

Bellator 43 was a mixed martial arts held by Bellator Fighting Championships. The event took place on May 7, 2011 at the First Council Casino in Newkirk, Oklahoma. The card featured the final fight in the Bellator Season Four Welterweight Tournament. The event was distributed live in prime time by MTV2.

Background

A heavyweight bout between Neil Grove and The Ultimate Fighter 10 alumnus, Zak Jensen was scheduled for this event; however, Grove pulled out of the bout on May 3 due to an injury.

A local feature bout between George Burton and John Bryant was also scratched.

The event drew an estimated 182,000 viewers on MTV2.

Results

Main card
 Welterweight Tournament Final bout:  Jay Hieron vs.  Rick Hawn
Hieron defeated Hawn via split decision (29–28, 28–29, 29–28) to win Bellator's Season Four Welterweight Tournament.
 Middleweight bout:  Joe Riggs vs.  Bryan Baker
Baker defeated Riggs via KO (punch) at 3:53 of round 2 to earn a spot in Bellator's Season Five Middleweight Tournament
 Bantamweight bout:  Jose Vega vs.  Chase Beebe
Beebe defeated Vega via submission (guillotine choke) at 4:06 of round 1 to earn a spot in Bellator's Season Five Bantamweight Tournament
 Heavyweight bout:  Vince Lucero vs.  Ron Sparks
Sparks defeated Lucero via submission (keylock) at 2:18 of round 1.

Local feature fights
 Catchweight (179 lb) bout:  Rich Bouphanouvong vs.  David Rickels
Rickels defeated Bouphanouvong via submission (triangle choke) at 1:11 of round 2.  This bout aired on the broadcast.
 Lightweight bout:  Mike Schatz vs.  Michael Osborn
Osborn defeated Schatz via TKO (referee stoppage) at 1:58 of round 1

Bellator 44

Bellator 44 was a mixed martial arts event held by Bellator Fighting Championships. The event took place on May 14, 2011, at Harrah's Resort. The card featured the final fight in the Bellator Season Four Lightweight Tournament.  The event was distributed live in prime time by MTV2.

Background

EliteXC and Ring of Combat veteran James Jones was expected to fight at this event, but a bout did not materialize.

Lyman Good was scheduled to face Dan Hornbuckle in a welterweight bout. However, on May 6, Good pulled out of the fight due to an injury.

A scheduled bout between Anthony Morrison and Bryan Goldsby was canceled due to Morrison weighing-in 10 pounds over weight.

The event drew a season high of 325,000 average viewers on MTV2.

Results

Main card
 Lightweight Tournament Final bout:  Patricky Freire vs.  Michael Chandler
Chandler defeated Freire via unanimous decision (29–27, 29–27, 29–27). Chandler was docked one point in round 3 due to kicks to the groin.
 Middleweight bout:  Hector Lombard vs.  Falaniko Vitale
Lombard defeated Vitale via KO (punch) at 0:54 of round 3.
 Welterweight bout:  Giedrius Karavackas vs.  Sam Oropeza
Karavackas defeated Oropeza via submission (scarf hold armlock) at 3:59 of round 3.
 Middleweight bout:  Alexander Shlemenko vs.  Brett Cooper
Shlemenko defeated Cooper via unanimous decision (30–27, 30–28, 29–28).

Local feature fights
 Heavyweight bout:  Randy Smith vs.  Jamall Johnson
Johnson defeated Smith via submission (rear-naked choke) at 4:16 of round 2.
 Featherweight bout:  Anthony Leone vs.  Jeff Lentz
Lentz defeated Leone via unanimous decision (29–28, 29–28, 29–28).
 Middleweight bout:  Jay Silva vs.  Gemiyale Adkins
Silva defeated Adkins via unanimous decision (30–26, 30–27, 30–27).

Bellator 45

Bellator 45 was a mixed martial arts event held by Bellator Fighting Championships.  The event took place on May 21, 2011 at the L'Auberge du Lac Resort in Lake Charles, Louisiana. The card featured final round fights in the Bellator Season Four Featherweight and Light Heavyweight Tournaments. The event was distributed live in prime time by MTV2.

Background

Kalvin Hackney, whose fight was canceled at Bellator 36, was moved to fight at this event.

A bout between Thiago Santos and Derrick Lewis was scrapped after Santos suffered an injury.

The event drew an estimated 264,000 viewers on MTV2.

Results

Main card
 Light Heavyweight Tournament Championship bout:  Rich Hale vs.  Christian M'Pumbu
M'Pumbu defeated Hale via TKO (punches) at 4:17 of round 3.
 Featherweight Tournament Final bout:  Patricio Freire vs.  Daniel Straus
Freire defeated Straus via unanimous decision (29–28, 30–27, 30–27).
 Middleweight bout:  Karl Amoussou vs.  Sam Alvey
Alvey defeated Amoussou via split decision (29–28, 28–29, 29–28).

Local feature fights
 Heavyweight bout:  Shawn Jordan vs.  Johnathan Hill
Jordan defeated Hill via TKO (strikes) at 1:56 of round 1. This bout was fought after the main event due to time constraints.
 Middleweight bout:  Tim Ruberg vs.  Michael Fleniken
Ruberg defeated Fleniken via unanimous decision (30–27, 30–27, 30–27).
 Welterweight bout:  Luis Santos vs.  Nicolae Cury
Santos defeated Cury via unanimous decision (30–27, 30–27, 30–27).
 Lightweight bout:  Renê Nazare vs.  Kelvin Hackney
Nazare defeated Hackney via submission (rear-naked choke) at 4:44 of round 1.
 Catchweight (140 lb) bout:  Joseph Abercrombie vs.  Ben Parpart
Abercrombie defeated Parpart via submission (rear-naked choke) at 1:11 of round 1.

Tournaments

Light Heavyweight tournament bracket

Welterweight tournament bracket

Lightweight tournament bracket

Featherweight tournament bracket

Bellator 46

Bellator 46 was a mixed martial arts event held by Bellator Fighting Championships. The event took place on June 25, 2011 at the Seminole Hard Rock Hotel & Casino in Hollywood, Florida. The card was part of Bellator's inaugural Summer Series and featured opening round fights in the Summer Series Tournament. The event was distributed live in prime time by MTV2.

Background

This event hosted the first round of an eight-man featherweight tournament to be held over the Summer Series.

David Baggett missed the middleweight limit allowance of 186 for non-title fights, weighing in at 191.5 lb, and his bout with Moyses Gabin was scrapped from the card.

The event drew an estimated 185,000 viewers on MTV2.

Results

Main card
 Featherweight Quarterfinal bout:  Pat Curran vs.  Luis Palomino
Curran defeated Palomino via submission (peruvian neck-tie) at 3:49 of round 1.
 Featherweight Quarterfinal bout:  Marlon Sandro vs.  Genair da Silva
Sandro defeated da Silva via split decision (30–27, 28–29, 29–28).
 Featherweight Quarterfinal bout:  Nazareno Malegarie vs.  Jacob DeVree
Malegarie defeated DeVree via submission (guillotine choke) at 1:25 of round 3.
 Featherweight Quarterfinal bout:  Ronnie Mann vs.  Adam Schindler
Mann defeated Schindler via KO (punches) at 4:14 of round 1.

Local feature fights
 Women's (115 lb) bout:  Jessica Aguilar vs.  Carla Esparza
Aguilar defeated Esparza via split decision (30–27, 28–29, 30–27).
 Heavyweight bout:  Tony Johnson vs.  Derrick Lewis
Johnson defeated Lewis via unanimous decision (29–28, 29–28, 29–28).
 Catchweight bout (152 lb):  Alexandre Bezerra vs.  Sam Jones
Bezerra defeated Jones via submission (triangle choke) at 3:27 of round 1.
 Middleweight bout:  Dan Cramer vs.  Josh Samman
Cramer defeated Samman via unanimous decision (29–28, 29–28, 29–28).

Bellator 47

Bellator 47 was a mixed martial arts event held by Bellator Fighting Championships.  The event took place on July 23, 2011 at Casino Rama in Rama, Ontario.  The card featured semi-final fights in the Bellator 2011 Summer Series Featherweight Tournament. The event was distributed live in prime time by MTV2.

Background

This event was to feature Joe Warren's first defense of his featherweight title against season four tournament winner Patricio Freire. Freire, however, pulled out of the fight in early July due to a broken hand.

This was Bellator's first event in Canada. Bellator 4 was set to take place in Canada, but was moved due to the promotion unable to come to terms with the Quebec Boxing Commission.

Ben Saunders was expected to fight at this event, but had to pull out due to an undisclosed injury he suffered in training.

Bantamweights Bo Harris and Bryan Goldsby were originally announced to be facing each other, but the bout did not materialize in the days leading up to the event as Harris failed to complete his medical requirements in a timely fashion.

The event drew an estimated 277,000 viewers on MTV2.

Results

Main card
 Featherweight Semifinal bout:  Pat Curran vs.  Ronnie Mann
Curran defeated Mann via unanimous decision (29–28, 30–27, 30–27).
 Featherweight Semifinal bout:  Marlon Sandro vs.  Nazareno Malegarie
Sandro defeated Malegarie via unanimous decision (30–27, 30–27, 30–27).
 Lightweight bout:  Chris Horodecki vs.  Chris Saunders
Horodecki defeated Saunders via unanimous decision (30–27, 30–27, 30–27).
 Heavyweight bout:  Neil Grove vs.  Zak Jensen
Grove defeated Jensen via TKO (punches) at 2:00 of round 1.

Local feature fights
 Lightweight bout:  Alexandre Bezerra vs.  Jesse Gross
Bezerra defeated Gross via technical submission (rear-naked choke) at 1:28 of round 1. This bout aired on the MTV2 broadcast following the Horodecki vs. Saunders bout.
 Featherweight bout:  William Romero vs.  Daniel Langbeen
Romero defeated Langbeen via unanimous decision (29–28, 30–27, 30–27).
 Lightweight bout:  Alka Matewa vs.  Alex Ricci
Ricci defeated Matewa via TKO (elbows and punches) at 2:40 of round 2.

Bellator 48

Bellator 48 was a mixed martial arts event held by Bellator Fighting Championships. The event took place on August 20, 2011 at the Mohegan Sun Arena in Uncasville, Connecticut. The card was part of Bellator's inaugural Summer Series and featured the final round fights in the Summer Series Tournament. The event was distributed live in prime time by MTV2.

Background

This event hosted the final round of an eight-man featherweight tournament that was held over the Summer Series.

John Clarke was expected to face Dan Cramer, but an injury forced Clarke out of the bout. Jeff "The Wolfman" Nader stepped in as Clarke's replacement.

The event drew an estimated 226,000 viewers on MTV2.

Results

Main card
 Featherweight Tournament Final:  Pat Curran vs.  Marlon Sandro
Curran defeated Sandro via KO (head kick and punches) at 4:00 of round 2.
 Heavyweight bout:  Cole Konrad vs.  Paul Buentello
Konrad defeated Buentello via unanimous decision (30-27, 30-27, 29-28).
 Catchweight (230 lb) bout:  Ricco Rodriguez vs.  Seth Petruzelli
Petruzelli defeated Rodriguez via KO (punches) at 4:21 of round 1.
 Lightweight bout:  Juan Barrantes vs.  Renê Nazare
Nazare defeated Barrantes via TKO (doctor stoppage) at 5:00 of round 2.

Local feature fights
 Light Heavyweight bout:  Dan Cramer vs.  Jeff Nader
Nader defeated Cramer via TKO (punches) at 1:04 of round 3.
 Light Heavyweight bout:  Nik Fekete vs.  Mark Griffin
Fekete defeated Griffin via TKO (elbows) at 3:12 of round 2.
 Lightweight bout:  Andrew Calandrelli vs.  Matt Nice
Calandrelli defeated Nice via submission (keylock) at 3:55 of round 1.
 Welterweight bout:  Brett Oteri vs.  Ryan Quinn
Quinn defeated Oteri via technical submission (rear naked choke) at 1:48 of round 1. This bout aired on the MTV2 broadcast following the Rodriguez vs. Petruzelli bout.
 Featherweight bout:  Saul Almeida vs.  Tateki Matsuda
Almeida defeated Matsuda via unanimous decision (30-27, 30-27, 29-28).

Featherweight tournament bracket

Bellator 49

Bellator 49 was a mixed martial arts event held by Bellator Fighting Championships. The event took place on September 10, 2011 at Caesars Atlantic City in Atlantic City, New Jersey. The card was the debut of the promotion's fifth season and distributed live in prime time by MTV2.

Background

This event hosted the first round of an eight-man welterweight tournament to be held over the duration of Bellator's fifth season.

Rick Hawn was expected to face Ben Saunders at this event but Hawn was forced out of the bout due to a knee injury. Hawn was replaced by Bellator newcomer Chris Cisneros.

The Ultimate Fighter 12 competitor, Andy Main, was set to fight Kenny Foster on the undercard of this event. However, after an undisclosed injury, Main was pulled from the bout.

On September 6, 2011, it was announced Bellator's Season 5 "Local Feature Fights" would be streamed live on Spike.com, starting with this event.

The event drew an estimated 235,000 viewers on MTV2.

Results

Main card
 Welterweight Quarterfinal bout:  Chris Lozano vs.  Brent Weedman
Lozano defeated Weedman via unanimous decision (29-28, 29-28, 29-28).
 Welterweight Quarterfinal bout:  Ben Saunders vs.  Chris Cisneros
Saunders defeated Cisneros via TKO (knee to body and punches) at 0:29 of round 3.
 Welterweight Quarterfinal bout:  Luis Santos vs.  Dan Hornbuckle
Santos defeated Hornbuckle via unanimous decision (30-27, 30-27, 30-27).
 Welterweight Quarterfinal bout:  Steve Carl vs.  Douglas Lima
Lima defeated Carl via unanimous decision (29-28, 30-27, 30-27).

Local feature fights (Spike.com)
 Catchweight bout (147 lb):  Alexandre Bezerra vs.  Scott Heckman
Bezerra defeated Heckman via TKO (punches) at 1:38 in round 2.
 Welterweight bout:  Giedrius Karavackas vs.  LeVon Maynard
Karavackas defeated Maynard via TKO (knee and punches) at 1:32 in round 3.
 Featherweight bout:  Brylan Van Artsdalen vs.  Joel Roberts
Roberts defeated Van Artsdalen via technical submission (triangle choke) at 1:47 in round 2.
 Catchweight bout (150 lb):  James Jones vs.  Lester Caslow
Caslow defeated Jones via TKO (injury) at 0:15 in round 2.
 Heavyweight bout:  Azunna Anyanwu vs.  J.A. Dudley
Anyanwu defeated Dudley via TKO (punches) at 4:16 in round 2.

Bellator 50

Bellator 50 was a mixed martial arts event held by Bellator Fighting Championships. The event took place on September 17, 2011 at the Seminole Hard Rock Hotel & Casino in Hollywood, Florida. The event was distributed live in prime time by MTV2.

Background

The event hosted the opening round of the middleweight tournament in Bellator's fifth season.

Veteran welterweight fighter Ailton Barbosa won Bellator's open tryouts in Hollywood, Florida in June 2011 to earn his spot on the card.

R.J. Goodridge was scheduled to fight J. P. Reese, but after suffering an undisclosed injury Goodridge pulled out of the bout and was replaced by Martin Brown. Also, Ryan Hodge was scheduled to fight Valdir Araujo, but was pulled from the bout with an injury, and replaced with Brett Cooper.

On September 15, 2011, Luis Palomino suffered an injury in training and was pulled from his scheduled bout with James Edson Berto. Berto was later pulled from the card as well, and the fight was scratched altogether; The two then met at W-1: Reloaded in which Palomino defeated Berto.

A scheduled lightweight bout between Dietter Navarro and Marcelo Goncalves was changed into a 156 lb catchweight bout after both fighters missed weight.

The event drew an estimated 114,000 viewers on MTV2.

Results

Main card
 Middleweight Quarterfinal bout:  Jared Hess vs.  Bryan Baker
Baker defeated Hess via TKO (strikes) at 2:52 of round 3.
 Middleweight Quarterfinal bout:  Victor O'Donnell vs.  Brian Rogers
Rogers defeated O'Donnell via TKO (strikes) at 1:56 of round 1.
 Middleweight Quarterfinal bout:  Zelg Galesic vs.  Alexander Shlemenko
Shlemenko defeated Galesic via submission (standing guillotine) at 1:55 of round 1
 Middleweight Quarterfinal bout:  Sam Alvey vs.  Vitor Vianna 
Vianna defeated Alvey via split decision (29-28, 28-29, 29-28).

Local feature fights (Spike.com)
 Catchweight (140 lb) bout:  Marcos da Matta vs.  Shah Bobonis
Bobonis defeated da Matta via KO (punch) at 2:04 of round 3.
 Catchweight (156 lb) bout:  Dietter Navarro vs.  Marcelo Goncalves
Goncalves defeated Navarro via submission (armbar) at 2:01 of round 1.
 Middleweight bout:  Brett Cooper vs.  Valdir Araujo
Cooper defeated Araujo via TKO (punches) at 0:35 of round 3.
 Lightweight bout:  Rad Martinez vs.  Brian van Hoven
Martinez defeated van Hoven via unanimous decision (30-27, 30-27, 30-27).
 Welterweight bout:  Ailton Barbosa vs.  Ryan Keenan
Barbosa defeated Keenan via submission (rear-naked choke) at 1:55 of round 1.
 Welterweight bout:  Cristiano Souza vs.  John Kelly
Souza defeated Kelly via unanimous decision (29-28, 29-28, 29-28).
 Lightweight bout:  J. P. Reese vs.  Martin Brown
Reese defeated Brown via unanimous decision (30-27, 30-27, 30-27).

Bellator 51

Bellator 51 was a mixed martial arts event held by Bellator Fighting Championships. The event took place on September 24, 2011 at the Canton Memorial Civic Center in Canton, Ohio.  The event was distributed live in prime time by MTV2.

Background

This event hosted the first round of an eight-man bantamweight tournament to be held over the course of Bellator's fifth season.

Joe Soto was originally scheduled to face Eduardo Dantas in the opening round of the bantamweight-tournament.  However, he was pulled from the bout after losing to Eddie Yagin at Tachi Palace Fights 10 and replaced by Wilson Reis.

The Jessica Eye-Casey Noland bout was changed from 125 lb to a 127 lb catchweight after Noland failed to make weight./

The event drew an estimated 158,000 viewers on MTV2.

Results

Main card
 Bantamweight Quarterfinal bout:  Joe Warren vs.  Alexis Vila
Vila defeated Warren via KO (punch) at 1:04 of round 1.
 Bantamweight Quarterfinal bout:  Wilson Reis vs.  Eduardo Dantas
Dantas defeated Reis via KO (flying knee and punches) at 1:02 of round 2.
 Bantamweight Quarterfinal bout:  Chase Beebe vs.  Marcos Galvão
Galvao defeated Beebe via split decision (29-28, 28-29, 29-28).
 Bantamweight Quarterfinal bout:  Ed West vs.  Luis Nogueira
West defeated Nogueira via unanimous decision (29-28, 29-28, 30-27).

Local feature fights (Spike.com)
 Featherweight bout:  Frank Caraballo vs.  Dustin Kempf
Caraballo defeated Kempf via TKO (Knee Injury) at 1:19 of Round 1.
 Women's (127 lb) bout:  Jessica Eye vs.  Casey Noland
Eye defeated Noland via split decision (29–28, 28–29, 29–28).
 Bantamweight bout:  Farkhad Sharipov vs.  Jessie Riggleman
Riggleman defeated Sharipov via split decision (29–28, 28–29, 30–27).
 Light Heavyweight bout:  Dane Bonnigson vs.  Dan Spohn
Spohn defeated Bonnigson via KO (knee) at 0:09 of round 1.
 Light Heavyweight bout:  John Hawk vs.  Allan Weickert
Hawk defeated Weickert via TKO (retirement) at 5:00 of round 2.
 Lightweight bout:  Clint Musser vs.  Joey Holt
Holt defeated Musser via KO (flying knee) at 4:07 of round 1.

Bellator 52

Bellator 52 was a mixed martial arts event held by Bellator Fighting Championships. It took place on October 1, 2011 at the L'Auberge du Lac Casino Resort in Lake Charles, Louisiana, Louisiana. The event was distributed live in prime time by MTV2.

Background

This event hosted the opening round of Bellator's second heavyweight tournament.

Blagoy Ivanov was originally scheduled to face Thiago Santos.  Santos, however, was unable to travel from Brazil for the event and was replaced by Zak Jensen.

The event drew an estimated 269,000 viewers on MTV 2.

Results

Main card
 Heavyweight Quarterfinal bout:  Neil Grove vs.  Mike Hayes
Hayes defeated Grove via split decision (29-28, 28-29, 29-28).
 Heavyweight Quarterfinal bout:  Blagoy Ivanov vs.  Zak Jensen
Ivanov defeated Jensen via technical submission (guillotine choke) at 2:35 of round 2.
 Heavyweight Quarterfinal bout:  Eric Prindle vs.  Abe Wagner
Prindle defeated Wagner via unanimous decision (29-28, 29-28, 29-28).
 Heavyweight Quarterfinal bout:  Mark Holata vs.  Ron Sparks
Sparks defeated Holata via KO (punches) at 1:24 of round 1.

Local feature fights (Spike.com)
 Catchweight 150 lb bout:  Genair da Silva vs.  Bryan Goldsby
da Silva defeated Goldsby via submission (D'arce choke) at 3:51 of round 1.
 Lightweight bout:  Cosmo Alexandre vs.  Josh Quayhagen
Quayhagen defeated Alexandre via unanimous decision (30-27, 30-27, 30-27).
 Heavyweight bout:  Liron Wilson vs.  Justin Frazier
Frazier defeated Wilson via TKO (punches) at 1:50 of round 1.
 Catchweight (213 lb) bout:  Matt Van Buren vs.  Nick Nichols
Van Buren defeated Nichols via TKO (punches) at 2:29 of round 2.

Bellator 53

Bellator 53 was a mixed martial arts event held by Bellator Fighting Championships. The event took place on October 8, 2011 at the Buffalo Run Hotel & Casino in Miami, Oklahoma. The event was distributed live in prime time by MTV2.

Background

This event hosted the second round of the Bellator Season 5 Welterweight Tournament.

The event drew an estimated 103,000 viewers on MTV2.

Results

Main card
 Welterweight Semifinal bout:  Ben Saunders vs.  Luis Santos
Saunders defeated Santos via submission (americana) at 1:45 of round 3.
 Welterweight Semifinal bout:  Chris Lozano vs.  Douglas Lima
Lima defeated Lozano via KO (punch) at 3:14 of round 2.
 Featherweight bout:  Ronnie Mann vs.  Kenny Foster
Mann defeated Foster via submission (triangle choke) at 3:51 of round 1.
 Heavyweight Tournament Reserve bout:  Thiago Santos vs.  Josh Burns
Santos defeated Burns via submission (rear-naked choke) at 2:23 of round 1.

Local feature fights (Spike.com)
 Catchweight (160) bout:  E. J. Brooks vs.  Greg Scott
 Brooks defeated Scott via TKO (punches) at 2:40 of round 2.
 Middleweight bout:  Darryl Cobb vs.  Giva Santana
 Santana defeated Cobb via submission (armbar) at 2:00 of round 1.
 Catchweight (175) bout:  A.J. Matthews vs.  Rudy Bears
 Matthews defeated Bears via unanimous decision (29-28 29-28 29-28).
 Light Heavyweight bout:  Raphael Davis vs.  Myron Dennis
Davis defeated Dennis via KO (punch) at 0:29 of round 2.
 Welterweight bout:  Levi Avera vs.  David Rickels
Rickels defeated Avera via submission (triangle choke) at 1:06 of round 2.
 Catchweight (140) bout:  Zak Laird vs.  Luis Nogueira
Nogueira defeated Laird via submission (guillotine choke) at 0:51 of round 1.

Bellator 54

Bellator 54 was a mixed martial arts event held by Bellator Fighting Championships. The event took place on October 15, 2011 at the Boardwalk Hall in Atlantic City, New Jersey. The event was distributed live in prime time by MTV2.

Background

Bellator bantamweight champion, Zach Makovsky, competed in a non-title bout at this event. He faced one-time UFC competitor Ryan Roberts.

This event hosted the second round of the Bellator Season 5 Middleweight Tournament.

Eddie Alvarez was scheduled to make his second title defense of his lightweight championship against Michael Chandler on this card; however, on September 20, it was announced that Alvarez suffered an injury and the match has been pushed back to Bellator 58.

Karl Amoussou was expected to make his welterweight debut at this event against Joey Kirwan. However, for unknown reasons, Amoussou was pulled from the bout and replaced by Lewis Rumsy.

Results

Main card
 Middleweight Semifinal bout:  Alexander Shlemenko vs.  Brian Rogers
Shlemenko defeated Rogers via TKO (knees) at 2:30 of round 2.
 Middleweight Semifinal bout:  Bryan Baker vs.  Vitor Vianna
Vianna defeated Baker via TKO (punches) at 0:54 of round 1.
 Bantamweight bout:  Zach Makovsky vs.  Ryan Roberts
Makovsky defeated Roberts via submission (north/south choke) at 4:48 of round 1.
 Lightweight bout:  Jacob Kirwan vs.  Renê Nazare
Kirwan defeated Nazare via unanimous decision (29-28, 30-27, 30-27).

Local feature fights (Spike.com)
 Middleweight bout:  Daniel Gracie vs.  Duane Bastress
Bastress defeated Gracie via TKO (doctor stoppage) at 5:00 of round 2.
 Light Heavyweight bout:  Tim Carpenter vs.  Ryan Contaldi
Carpenter defeated Contaldi via TKO (punch) at 2:16 of round 1.
 Catchweight (187 lb) bout:  Lewis Rumsey vs.  Joey Kirwan
Kirwan defeated Rumsey via submission (guillotine choke) at 1:40 of round 1.
 Catchweight (140 lb) bout:  Brian Kelleher vs.  Claudio Ledesma
Ledesma defeated Kelleher via unanimous decision (30-27, 30-27, 30-27).
 Women's (145 lb) bout:  Andria Caplan vs.  Adrienne Seiber
Caplan defeated Seiber via unanimous decision (29-28, 29-28, 29-28).

Bellator 55

Bellator 55 was a mixed martial arts event held by Bellator Fighting Championships on October 22, 2011 at Cocopah Resort and Casino in Somerton, Arizona. The event was distributed live in prime time by MTV2.

Background

This event hosted the second round of Bellator's Season Five Bantamweight Tournament.

Bellator Light Heavyweight Champion Christian M'Pumbu fought Travis Wiuff in a non-title bout. M'Pumbu become the first Bellator champion to lose in a non-title bout.

Despite a close split decision loss, main eventer Marcos Galvão was awarded a "win" bonus.

The event earned an average of 168,000 viewers on MTV2.

Results

Main card
 Bantamweight Semifinal bout:  Alexis Vila vs.  Marcos Galvão
Vila defeated Galvão via split decision (27-30, 29-28, 29-28).
 Bantamweight Semifinal bout:  Ed West vs.  Eduardo Dantas
Dantas defeated West via split decision (29-28, 28-29, 30-27).
 Light Heavyweight bout:  Christian M'Pumbu vs.  Travis Wiuff
Wiuff defeated M'Pumbu via unanimous decision (30-27, 29-28, 29-28).
 Lightweight bout:  Ricardo Tirloni vs.  Steve Gable
Tirloni defeated Gable via submission (rear-naked choke) at 3:54 in round 2.

Local feature fights (Spike.com)
 Lightweight bout:  Cesar Avila vs.  Efrain Escudero
Escudero defeated Avila via submission (guillotine choke) at 1:55 in round 1.
 Catchweight (210 lb) bout:  Rich Hale vs.  Carlos Flores
Hale defeated Flores via TKO (punch) at 0:18 in round 1.
 Middleweight bout:  Edgar Garcia vs.  Jacob Ortiz
Ortiz defeated Garcia via KO (punch) at 4:06 of round 1.
 Catchweight (158 lb) bout:  Erin Beach vs.  Roscoe Jackson
Beach defeated Jackson via submission (rear-naked choke) at 3:52 in round 1.
 Featherweight bout:  Nick Piedmont vs.  Jade Porter
Porter defeated Piedmont via unanimous decision (29-28, 30-27, 30-27).
 Middleweight bout:  Steve Steinbeiss vs.  Dano Moore
Steinbeiss defeated Moore via submission (rear-naked choke) at 4:52 in round 1.

Bellator 56

Bellator 56 was a mixed martial arts event held by Bellator Fighting Championships. It took place on October 29, 2011 at Memorial Hall in Kansas City, Kansas. The event was distributed live in prime time by MTV2.

Background

This event hosted the second round of Bellator's second heavyweight tournament.

Mike Hayes was expected to face Blagoi Ivanov at this event, However Hayes was issued a 60-day medical suspension by the Louisiana Boxing and Wrestling Commission due to a fractured orbital bone sustained during his fight with Neil Grove at Bellator 52. Thiago Santos stepped in for the injured Hayes.  Ivanov subsequently had to pull out of the bout due to an injury and was replaced by Neil Grove.

Results

Main card
 Welterweight Championship bout:  Ben Askren (c) vs.  Jay Hieron
 Askren defeated Hieron via split decision (47-48, 48-47, 48-47).
 Heavyweight Semifinal bout:  Thiago Santos vs.  Neil Grove
 Santos defeated Grove via submission (rear-naked choke) at 0:38 of Round 1.
 Heavyweight Semifinal bout:  Eric Prindle vs.  Ron Sparks
 Prindle defeated Sparks via KO (Punch) at 0:40 of Round 1.

Local Feature Fight (Spike.com)
 Welterweight bout:  Rudy Bears vs.  Marcio Navarro
Navarro defeated Bears via split decision (29-28, 27-30, 29-28).
 Featherweight bout:  Adam Schindler vs.  Jeremy Spoon
Spoon defeated Schindler via unanimous decision. This bout aired on MTV2 following the Prindle/Sparks match.
 Light Heavyweight bout:  Kelvin Tiller vs.  Dan Spohn
Tiller defeated Spohn via split decision (30-27, 28-29, 29-28).
 Lightweight bout:  Willian De Souza vs.  E. J. Brooks
Brooks defeated De Souza via unanimous decision (29-27, 30-26, 30-26).
 Featherweight bout:  Jeimeson Saudino vs.  Jacob Akin
Akin defeated Saudino via submission (rear-naked choke) at 3:26 of round 1.
 Bantamweight bout:  Aaron Ely vs.  Owen Evinger
Ely defeated Evinger via submission (rear-naked choke) at 3:45 of round 1.
 Heavyweight bout:  Daniel Gallemore vs.  Derrick Ruffin
Gallemore defeated Ruffin via TKO (retirement) at 5:00 of round 2.

Bellator 57

Bellator 57 was a mixed martial arts event held by Bellator Fighting Championships. It took place on November 12, 2011 at Casino Rama in Rama, Ontario. The event was distributed live in primetime by MTV2.

Background

This was the second time that Bellator has come to Canada. Previously, Bellator 47 was also held in Rama, Ontario.

This event hosted the final rounds of Bellator's Season Five Welterweight Tournament and  Bellator's Season Five Middleweight Tournament.

Bellator's Women's champion, Zoila Gurgel, was scheduled to compete in a non-title bout against Carina Damm.  However, an injury forced her off the card.

Results

Main card
 Welterweight Tournament Final:  Douglas Lima vs.  Ben Saunders
Lima defeated Saunders via KO (punches) at 1:21 of round 2.
 Middleweight Tournament Final:  Alexander Shlemenko vs.  Vitor Vianna
Shlemenko defeated Vianna via unanimous decision (30-27, 30-27, 29-28).
 Light Heavyweight bout:  Roger Hollett vs.  John Hawk
 Hollett defeated Hawk via split decision (29-28, 28-29, 29-28).
 Featherweight bout:  Alexandre Bezerra vs.  Doug Evans
Bezerra defeated Evans via submission (ankle lock) at 4:04 in round 1.

Local feature fights (Spike.com)
 Light Heavyweight bout:  Shawn Levesque vs.  Matt Van Buren
Van Buren defeated Levesque via submission (rear naked choke) at 4:38 in round 1.
 Lightweight bout:  Chris Horodecki vs.  Mike Corey
Horodecki vs. Corey declared a majority draw (29-28 Horodecki, 28-28, 28-28).
 Lightweight bout:  Ashkan Morvari vs.  Dave Jansen
Jansen defeated Morvari via submission (rear naked choke) at 2:47 in round 2.
 Bantamweight bout:  Chuck Mady vs.  Denis Puric
Puric defeated Mady via TKO (injury-broken jaw) at 5:00 in Round 2.
 Lightweight bout:  Eric Moon vs.  Josh Shockley
Shockley defeated Moon via submission (guillotine) at 0:35 in round 1.
 Lightweight bout:  Mike Sledzion vs.  Taylor Solomon
Solomon defeated Sledzion via KO (punch) at 1:10 in round 1.

Bellator 58

Bellator 58 was a mixed martial arts event held by Bellator Fighting Championships. It took place on November 19, 2011 at Seminole Hard Rock Hotel and Casino in Hollywood, Florida. The event was distributed live in prime time by MTV2.

Background

Shooto’s 183-pound South American champion, Carlos Alexandre Pereira, was expected to make his Bellator debut at this event.

Bellator Middleweight champion, Hector Lombard, was expected to compete in non-title, light heavyweight fight against UFC and Strikeforce veteran, Renato Sobral, at this event. However, for unknown reasons, Sobral was replaced by Trevor Prangley.

The event drew a season high 269,000 viewers with the immediate repeat also drawing 160,000 viewers.

Results

Main card
 Lightweight Championship bout:  Eddie Alvarez (c) vs.  Michael Chandler
Chandler defeated Alvarez via submission (rear naked choke) at 3:06 in round 4 to become the new Bellator Lightweight Champion.
 Catchweight (195lb) bout:  Hector Lombard vs.  Trevor Prangley
Lombard defeated Prangley via TKO (punches) at 1:06 in round 2.
 Women's (115 lb) bout:  Jessica Aguilar vs.  Lisa Ellis
Aguilar defeated Ellis via unanimous decision (30-27, 30-27, 30-27).
 Featherweight bout:  Marlon Sandro vs.  Rafael Dias
Sandro defeated Dias via submission (arm-triangle choke) at 3:56 in round 1.

Local feature fights (Spike.com)
 Middleweight bout:  Brett Cooper vs.  Jared Hess
Cooper defeated Hess via unanimous decision (29-28, 29-28, 29-28).
 Welterweight bout:  Valdir Araujo vs.  Ailton Barbosa
Araujo defeated Barbosa via unanimous decision (29-28, 29-28 , 29-28).
 Catchweight bout (157 lb):  Cosmo Alexandre vs.  Avery McPhatter
Alexandre defeated McPhatter via KO (knees) at 0:20 in round 1.
 Middleweight bout:  Jonas Billstein vs.  Herbert Goodman
Goodman defeated Billstein via disqualification (illegal soccer kick) at 3:21 in round 2.
 Lightweight bout:  Farkhad Sharipov vs.  Fabio Mello
Mello defeated Sharipov via unanimous decision (30-27, 30-27, 30-27).

Bellator 59

Bellator 59 was a mixed martial arts event held by Bellator Fighting Championships. It took place on November 26, 2011 at Caesars Atlantic City in Atlantic City, New Jersey. The event was distributed live in prime time by MTV2.

Background

This event hosted the final round of Bellator's Season Five Bantamweight Tournament as well as the Bellator's Season Five Heavyweight Tournament.

Michael Costa pulled out of his fight with Lyman Good due to an injury, which led the organization to scrap Good from the event all together. The lightweight bout between Phillipe Nover and Marcin Held was promoted to the main card.

The final of the Heavyweight tournament was ruled a No Contest after an accidental groin kick by Thiago Santos rendered Eric Prindle unable to continue. Following the event Santos failed to make weight for a scheduled rematch causing the bout to be cancelled, and Prindle to be awarded the tournament win by default.

Results

Main card
 Heavyweight Tournament Final bout:  Eric Prindle vs.  Thiago Santos
The bout was ruled a No Contest after Santos kicked Prindle in the groin at 1:24 of the round 1 and Prindle was unable to continue.
 Lightweight bout:  Patricky Freire vs.  Kurt Pellegrino
Freire defeated Pellegrino via TKO (punches) at 0:50 of round 1.
 Bantamweight Tournament Final bout:  Eduardo Dantas vs.  Alexis Vila
Dantas defeated Vila via unanimous decision (29-28, 29-28, 29-28).
 Lightweight bout:  Marcin Held vs.  Phillipe Nover
Held defeated Nover via split decision (29-28, 28-29, 29-28).

Local feature fights
'''Catchweight (175 lb) bout:  Karl Amoussou vs.  Jesus Martinez
Amoussou defeated Martinez via TKO (punches) at 2:20 of round 1.
 Welterweight bout:  LeVon Maynard vs.  Christopher Wing
Maynard defeated Wing via unanimous decision (30-27, 30-27, 30-26).
 Catchweight (175 lb) bout:  Doug Gordon vs.  Lucas Pimenta
Pimenta defeated Gordon via KO (elbows) at 0:40 in round 1.
 Featherweight bout:  Brylan Van Artsdalen vs.  Scott Heckman
Heckman defeated Van Artsdalen via submission (standing modified guillotine) at 1:38 in round 1.
 Middleweight bout:  Gregory Milliard vs.  Brandon Saling
Milliard defeated Saling via unanimous decision (30-27, 30-27, 30-27).

Tournaments

Heavyweight tournament bracket

Middleweight tournament bracket

Welterweight tournament bracket

Bantamweight tournament bracket

References

External links
 Bellator

2011 American television seasons
2011 in mixed martial arts
Bellator MMA events